Martin Warner (born 1972) is a British technology entrepreneur, and film producer. He is best known as the chief executive officer and founder of botObjects, Flix Premiere and Autonomous Flight.

Background
Martin Warner was born and raised in Biggin Hill, a district in Greater London, the county of Kent. He has an educational background as a software programmer and engineer.

Career 
In early 2010s, Martin Warner and Mike Duma co-founded botObjects, a 3D printing software and hardware manufacturer. In 2013, botObjects created a desktop 3D printer, which used Fused filament fabrication to create full-color 3D printing. In January 2015, botObjects was acquired by 3D Systems Inc, a US-based company developing 3D printer technologies.

Warner formed his next company, a British London-based, Flix Premiere, a media-services provider, which he founded in 2015. The company's primary focus has been on quality indie-films, which gain less attention from the other major streaming service providers and cinema theaters. The service launched in both the US and UK markets. The Guardian newspaper described the site as the Lidl of indie cinema, noting that "there were few familiar titles available on the site, but those available are the "best of the bunch" from film festivals and not available on other platforms".

Autonomous Flight, a technology startup developing pilotless drones, was established by Warner in 2015. Its first passenger drone model was the Y6S - a battery-powered pilotless flying vehicle, which underwent sub-scale flight testing for proof of concept. The company is also working on the next VTOL prototype (abbreviation for Vertical take-off and landing aircraft), the Y6S Plus, which will be a six-seater four people designed to provide Urban Air Transportation for the masses. 

Warner also took part as a producer/executive producer of a number of movies including Bikini Moon (2017), Butterfly Kisses (2017), The Other Kids (2016) and The Paddy Lincoln Gang (2014).

References

External links

Official website

Martin Warner on IMDb

Autonomous Flight

English businesspeople

Living people

1972 births